The 2003–04 Eredivisie season was the 44th season of the Eredivisie in basketball, the highest professional basketball league in the Netherlands. MPC Capitals won their second national title.

Teams 

Newly established club Fun4All Bergen op Zoom made its debut in the Eredivisie this season.

Arenas and locations

Regular season

Playoffs

Bracket

Finals

References 

Dutch Basketball League seasons
1
Netherlands